Logan Brock Warmoth (born September 6, 1995) is an American professional baseball shortstop in the Seattle Mariners organization.

High school and college
Warmoth attended Lake Brantley High School in Altamonte Springs, Florida. In high school, he was ranked as the number-two middle infielder in Florida and the number-six middle infielder nationally by Perfect Game. He also received the Underclass High Honorable Mention from Perfect Game in 2012 and 2013. He committed to the North Carolina Tar Heels over Clemson, Florida State and Stetson in 2014. He played for the Brewster Whitecaps in the Cape Cod Baseball League in the summer of 2016. In his freshman season, Warmoth started all 58 games for the Tar Heels and recorded a .246 batting average, 18 runs batted in (RBI), and 11 stolen bases. As a sophomore, Warmoth hit .337 with four home runs, a team-leading 53 RBI, and eight stolen bases in 53 games played. In 2017, Warmoth led the team with a .336 batting average, .554 slugging percentage, 60 runs scored, 19 doubles, and 10 home runs. Warmoth won the Brooks Wallace Award for the nation's top college shortstop.

Professional career

Minor leagues
In the 2017 Major League Baseball draft, Warmoth was selected 22nd overall by the Toronto Blue Jays. Warmoth signed with the Blue Jays on June 28, and received a $2.82 million signing bonus. He was assigned to the Rookie-level Gulf Coast League Blue Jays, and appeared in six games before being promoted to the Short Season-A Vancouver Canadians of the Northwest League. In total, Warmoth appeared in 45 regular season games and hit .302 with two home runs, 23 RBI, and six stolen bases. In 2018, Warmoth played with the Dunedin Blue Jays where he hit .248 with one home run and 28 RBIs in 75 games. He split the 2019 season between Dunedin and the New Hampshire Fisher Cats, slashing .235/.324/.333 with three home runs and 31 RBIs over 101 games. In 2021, he played with the Buffalo Bisons where he batted .228 with nine home runs and 41 RBIs in 107 games.

After the 2022 season, the Seattle Mariners selected Warmoth from the Blue Jays in the Rule 5 draft.

Personal life
Warmoth grew up in Altamonte Springs, Florida, with his two older brothers, Justin and Tyler. Tyler is a scout for the Seattle Mariners. Justin is a weekday morning anchor at Orlando CBS-affiliate WKMG. They are the sons of Greg and Christine Warmoth. Greg is the Orlando ABC-affiliate WFTV's weeknight anchor.

See also
Rule 5 draft results

References

External links

1995 births
Living people
All-American college baseball players
American expatriate baseball players in Canada
Baseball players from Orlando, Florida
Baseball shortstops
Brewster Whitecaps players
Buffalo Bisons (minor league) players
Dunedin Blue Jays players
Gulf Coast Blue Jays players
New Hampshire Fisher Cats players
North Carolina Tar Heels baseball players
Scottsdale Scorpions players
Vancouver Canadians players